Isaac Annan (born 4 March) is a Ghanaian footballer who currently plays as a goalkeeper  for Philippines Football League side Kaya–Iloilo and Ghana U-20.

Career
Annan started playing at Unistar Soccer Academy and Pure Joy FC. He played in the 2014 Ghana first divisional season with Charity FC before leaving for the Philippines where he joined Kaya–IloiloKaya–Iloilo in 2015.

References

1992 births
Living people
Ghanaian footballers
Ghanaian expatriate footballers
Expatriate footballers in the Philippines
Kaya F.C. players
Association football goalkeepers